Roseanna is a 1993 Swedish police film about Martin Beck, directed by Daniel Alfredson, based on the novel Roseanna (1965).

Plot
A young American tourist is murdered while on board a cruise ship set sail for Sweden. The body of a victim is discovered in the water by the police, who can't determine the cause of death due to loss of clues. When they finally find something, they use a policewoman as live bait to catch a killer, where she almost gets killed.

Cast
Gösta Ekman as Martin Beck
Kjell Bergqvist as Lennart Kollberg
Rolf Lassgård as Gunvald Larsson
Niklas Hjulström as Benny Skacke
Lena Nilsson as Åsa Thorell
Ingvar Andersson as Per Månsson
Bernt Ström as Einar Rönn
Torgny Anderberg as Evald Hammar
Jacob Nordenson as Folke Bengtsson
Anita Ekström as Inga Beck, Martin Beck's wife
Tova Magnusson-Norling as Putte Beck, Martin Beck's daughter
Anna Helena Bergendal as Roseanna
Donald Högberg as Karl Åke Eriksson
Viktor Ginner as Erik Beck, Martin Beck's son
Agneta Ekmanner as Greta Hjelm

References

External links

German mystery drama films
Swedish mystery drama films
Martin Beck films
Films directed by Daniel Alfredson
1990s Swedish-language films
1990s Swedish films
1990s German films